Almost Blue is the sixth studio album by English singer-songwriter Elvis Costello, and his fifth with the Attractions—keyboardist Steve Nieve, bassist Bruce Thomas and drummer Pete Thomas (no relation). It was recorded in May 1981 at CBS Studio A in Nashville, Tennessee, and released in October 1981 through F-Beat Records in the United Kingdom and Columbia Records in the United States. A departure from Costello's previous works, it is a covers album composed entirely of country music songs, including works written by Hank Williams, Merle Haggard, George Jones and Gram Parsons. Having already experimented with country during his career, the project originated with Costello's desire to record a collection of covers after Get Happy!! (1980) and Trust (1981) commercially underperformed following Armed Forces (1979).

Produced by Billy Sherrill, the recording sessions were marked by a fraught atmosphere, including resistance from Sherrill himself. The Doobie Brothers member John McFee contributed pedal steel as a way to add an authentic country sound. The album's songs are relatively straightforward renditions of their original counterparts, although Costello based some numbers off of other covers rather than the originals. His poor health during recording and troubled personal life, including his failing marriage and alcoholism, reflected in the song choices. All of the tracks express a "blue" state of mind, which is reflected in the cover artwork, an homage to Kenny Burrell's Midnight Blue (1963).

The lead single, a cover of Jones's "Good Year for the Roses", received heavy airplay and peaked at number six in the UK, while the second, a cover of Don Gibson's "Sweet Dreams", reached number 42. Upon release, Almost Blue reached number seven in the UK and number 50 in the US due to a lack of promotion. It received mixed reviews from music critics, who were divided on the vocal performances and debated on Costello's success as a country singer. It has continued to receive mixed reactions in later decades from critics and Costello's biographers and has placed low on lists ranking the artist's albums. Nevertheless, Rolling Stone argued in 2016 that the album predicted numerous unexpected musical excursions Costello took later in his career. It has been reissued multiple times with bonus tracks and extensive liner notes written by Costello himself.

Background

Elvis Costello had experimented with country music throughout his entire career to 1981. While he did not grow up listening to country music, his discovery of Gram Parsons' work with both the Byrds and the Flying Burrito Brothers, specifically Sweetheart of the Rodeo (1968) and The Gilded Palace of Sin (1969), respectively, inspired the artist to explore other acts country acts such as Merle Haggard and the Louvin Brothers. He played country rock songs during his time with the pub rock band Flip City in the mid-1970s and recorded the country tracks "Radio Sweetheart" and "Stranger in the House" during the sessions for his debut album My Aim Is True (1977); he originally intended to include the latter on the album but it was removed by his record label for being "too country". At the suggestion of Columbia Records' executive Greg Geller—who signed Costello to Columbia in America in 1977—Costello sang "Stranger in the House" as a duet with country musician George Jones in 1979, which appeared on the latter's My Very Special Guests album the same year. Costello first met Jones' longtime producer, Billy Sherrill, during an initial session in Nashville, Tennessee a year earlier, when Jones failed to show up, and the two hit it off, with Costello proclaiming: "If we are going to do a record of ballads and country music, I want to do it properly and go to the heart of it and do it with Billy Sherrill."

The weaker commercial performances of both Get Happy!! (1980) and Trust (1981) following the successful Armed Forces (1979) made Costello question where he was at in his career. He was unable to express his current thoughts in his own music and proclaimed that he "just wanted to sing other people's songs". Intending to explore his capabilities as a performer of cover versions, he recorded acoustic demos of "Gloomy Sunday" (1933), Cole Porter's "Love for Sale" (1930) and other classic popular songs. His initial vision was not limited to country music but rather "a collection of melancholy songs of many styles", similar to Frank Sinatra's Only the Lonely (1958). In an interview with Nicky Campbell, the artist explained:

Development
Released in January 1981, Trust featured the country pastiche song "Different Finger", which Costello wrote when he was 20. Shortly after its release, Costello and his backing band the Attractions—keyboardist Steve Nieve, bassist Bruce Thomas and drummer Pete Thomas (no relation)—were in Nashville on tour and taped covers of Hank Cochran's "He's Got You" (1962) and Bobby Bland's "I'll Take Care of You" (1959) at CBS Studio B, where the "Stranger in the House" duet was sung two years prior, with Pete Drake on pedal steel and Sherrill producing. The session would foreshadow Almost Blue. The band also road-tested several country songs during the tour. Although the rest of the band had hesitations about the project, Costello did not want to perform on his own with session musicians, stating: "Then it would be just like going to the funfair and sticking your head through one of those little cut-out things and having your picture taken. I thought it could a good emotional record. It was something that was very real to me when I did it." 

Rehearsals for the project commenced at Nick Lowe's Am-Pro Studios in early April 1981. Pete Thomas' associate from his former band Chilly Willy and the Red Hot Peppers, Paul "Bassman" Riley, contributed bass after Bruce Thomas fell ill. Over 40 songs were rehearsed in total. On 28April, Costello was in Los Angeles, contributing to a television special based on My Very Special Guests, performing "Stranger in the House", "He's Got You" and Haggard's "Tonight the Bottle Let Me Down" (1966). With Bruce Thomas still unavailable, the lineup consisted of Nieve, Pete Thomas, Lowe on bass and John Hiatt on guitar; Bruce recovered in time for the album sessions.

Songs Costello chose for the project included tracks recorded by Jones, Stonewall Jackson, Janis Martin, Webb Pierce, Conway Twitty and Charlie Rich. When Costello submitted his ideas to Sherrill, the producer felt the material was outdated and presented cassette tapes of songs he felt were better suited. Of the titles, Costello recalled seeing Elvis Presley's "Heartbreak Hotel" (1956) and a Willie Nelson demo titled "I Just Can't Let You Say Goodbye", which contained the bleak lines "the flesh around your neck is pale/indented by my fingernail". However, Sherrill was willing to see how the band would interpret the material "unless we write a new one". Sherrill also convinced Costello to record his own song "Too Far Gone".

Production

Recording

The album was recorded from 18 to 29 May 1981 at Nashville's CBS Studio A. Studio B, where classics such as Bob Dylan's Blonde on Blonde (1966) and Tammy Wynette's Stand by Your Man (1969) and Rich's Behind Closed Doors (1973) were recorded, was being renovated so operations were forced to move to Studio A, which Costello described as more generic and less atmospheric. Sherrill produced while Ron "Snake" Reynolds acted as engineer; it was Costello's first studio album not produced by Lowe. Alongside the Attractions, country musician John McFee, a member of the Doobie Brothers, was invited to contribute pedal steel and additional guitar overdubs to add an authentic country sound. Costello explained: "We wanted the sound but we didn't necessarily want the main instrumental line which usually comes from the steel in country to be somebody we'd never heard before." The sessions were filmed by a camera crew, who were directed by Peter Carr, for the TV arts programme The South Bank Show.

The camera crew did little to ease the already tense atmosphere. Costello himself was in poor health: he looked pale, was overweight and was constantly drinking, which led to the recording of Haggard's "Tonight the Bottle Let Me Down" and Rich's "Sittin' and Thinkin". According to Costello, Sherrill acted as a poor producer. Compared to Lowe, Sherrill was distant, uncommunicative and more interested in personal ventures, such as buying speedboats, than producing. With different work ethics, the producer and artist clashed frequently, with the latter stating that "after a while it was less of a collaboration and more of a contest in cultural differences". Costello recalled at one point finding Sherrill and Reynolds comparing handguns behind the mixing desk. 

The producer also had little faith in the project itself; he and CBS saw the sessions as an "Englishman's indulgence, a cultural holiday in music he didn't really understand". He later recalled: "I entered into the thing totally in the dark. I really wasn't into him that much. I didn't know what I could contribute." McFee even remembered an instance where Sherrill pulled him aside and asked him "What the hell does this guy think he wants to make a country record for?" The Attractions also disliked Sherrill, although Nieve and Pete Thomas enjoyed country music and the project as a whole, while Bruce Thomas did not. One day the band ran through a fast rendition of Hank Williams' "Why Don't You Love Me (Like You Used to Do)?", which Sherrill enjoyed and requested they mirror the take with a second. He later declared: "I've heard that song since I was eight weeks old and it's the only time I've ever heard it done that way. In fact, it's what I thought he was going to do with all the songs."

Despite the fraught atmosphere, Costello stated the sessions progressed quickly and productively. The band limited the tracks to only one or two takes before moving on to the next. Over 25 songs were recorded during the sessions, although a good portion attempted were never in serious contention for inclusion on the album; many lacked vocals and were not mixed until Costello returned to England and entered a studio with Riley at a later date. At one point the band attempted Costello's original "Tears Before Bedtime", which Sherrill found non-country and disapproved of. In the final days, Sherrill identified the recordings of Jones' "Good Year for the Roses" (1970) and Don Gibson's "Sweet Dreams" (1955) as potential hits so he added strings by Tommy Millar and backing vocals by Nashville Edition at a later date. After mixing, Costello and the Attractions had to dinner with Johnny Cash and his family to celebrate the occasion.

Composition

In a departure from Costello's previous works, Almost Blue is composed of 12 country songs that all reflect a "blue" state of mind. In his review for Melody Maker, Allan Jones stated that the tracks are divided between "driving, shitkicking honky tonk tunes and exquisitely poignant ballads". Costello's troubled personal life at the time, including his failing marriage and alcoholism, were reflected in the song choices, particularly Haggard's "Tonight the Bottle Let Me Down", Rich's "Sittin' and Thinkin" and Jones' "Brown to Blue". Rolling Stone Will Hodge argued that other than the "amped-up" version of Williams' "Why Don't You Love Me (Like You Used to Do)?" that opens the album—which Costello himself later stated "sounded like Rockpile on amphetamines"—the album itself bears little resemblance to the artist's previous works. Author Mick St. Michael also added that the opening track does not represent the album as a whole, a statement supported by Costello, who said "the meat of the album is the ballads".

Arrangement-wise, the songs are mostly straightforward renditions of their original counterparts, although Nieve devised new piano lines for "Brown to Blue" and "How Much I've Lied". Hinton feels his piano playing, in particular, stands out amongst the album. Costello also based some of the tracks off of other cover versions rather than the originals: having known of Patsy Cline's version of Gibson's "Sweet Dreams", Costello based his rendition on Tommy McLain's, while the arrangement for Big Joe Turner's "Honey Hush" (1953) was taken from the Johnny Burnette Trio version. Costello later commented that he went to Nashville to specifically record "Honey Hush". Along with "Brown to Blue" and "Good Year for the Roses", a cover of Jones' "Color of the Blues" (1958) also appears. The band recorded "Success" (1962), written by Johnny Mullins and sang by Loretta Lynn, at the insistence of Nieve, who recalled: "We must have gone through hundreds of albums, trying to find that one song that we could make our own." The remaining tracks included Sherrill's "Too Far Gone" and Parsons' "How Much I've Lied" and "Hot Burrito No. 1", the latter retitled  "I'm Your Toy". On "Hot Burrito No. 1", Costello commented that the song was one of his favourites and it was "an ambition" of his to cover it. St. Michael states that Costello utilised looser and less formal vocal performances on the Parsons tracks, which aid in their successes.

Packaging and artwork
The album's design is an homage to the 1963 Blue Note album Midnight Blue by Kenny Burrell and was packaged in four differently coloured sleeves, all with blue as the base. Photographed by Keith Morris, the image depicts Costello with his glasses removed and face covered with one hand – an ornate ring on his middle finger – appearing as though he is hiding tears. The original LP came with a removable sticker reading: "Warning: This album contains country & western music and may produce radical reaction in narrow minded people". In his 2015 memoir, Costello stated the "warning" was a tease for listeners who desired "More New Wave Hits". On the back cover, Costello and the Attractions, in Hinton's words, "grin faintly like psychos", along with an image of McFee in a Stetson. A logo reads "no spoiler signal".

Release

"Good Year for the Roses" was issued as the lead single, backed by a rendition of Jack Ripley's "Your Angel Steps Out of Heaven", in September 1981. It received heavy airplay on the more pop-oriented Radio One and MOR Radio Two and charted at number six on the UK Singles Chart, proving Costello's prediction that it "would probably reach a lot of people that don't buy our records normally". It was promoted with a music video that was filmed at the Meldrum House. According to Costello, they could not take a piano onto the wood floor of the saloon so Nieve mimed the string parts using a violin. The video received heavy airplay on MTV in America during the programme's early days. "Sweet Dreams" was released as the second single in December, backed by a live version of Leon Payne's "Psycho", and reached number 42 in the UK.

Almost Blue was released in October 1981 through F-Beat Records in the UK and Columbia in the US. It reached number seven on the UK Albums Chart and number 50 on the US Billboard Top LPs & Tape chart, the latter of which Costello attributed to the lack of promotion from country radio stations. F-Beat released an interview album subtitled Elvis Introduces His Favorite Country Songs to selected journalists and DJs as a promotional tool. Additionally, the South Bank Show special on its recording aired shortly after its release. The band took time off during the summer, with occasional live performances in late-July 1981 that mostly featured Costello's previous work with the Attractions and less country material. By August, he had begun writing original compositions on a grand piano and demoed several songs that would appear on his next album, Imperial Bedroom (1982).

Critical reception

Almost Blue received mixed reviews from music critics on release. In the UK, it was greeted with mostly positive reactions. In Melody Maker, Jones positively compared the artist's vocal performances to Trust, arguing that Costello's voice "has rarely enjoyed such freedom and expressive scope". He concluded that Almost Blue "unashamedly evoke[s] memories of all the places you thought you'd never leave but did, all the lovers you thought you'd still know, don't, but can't forget." Meanwhile, Paul Du Noyer deemed it "a richly satisfying sidestep" in NME, further saying that "it has the feel of being both a homage and a holiday". In a five-star review, Record Mirror Mike Nicholls proclaimed that "taken on its own terms, as a selection of country tunes with Elvis as mouthpiece, it's as flawless an LP as has been released all year". However, he noted that for his fans, Almost Blue "nowhere near approaches the intricate assortment of painstaking miniatures that comprise his usual collections," simply due to the lack of originals.

The artist's vocal performances, in particular, proved divisive in America, with many signalling out some renditions as successes and others as failures. In Rolling Stone, Martha Hume argued that "a truly great country singer" possesses both control of their own voice, the ability to broadcast a character and—ideally—is able to convey their own personality onto the listener. She stated that Costello succeeds at this on "Sweet Dreams", "I'm Your Toy" and "Good Year for the Roses", while failing on "Brown to Blue", "Tonight the Bottle Let Me Down" and "Color of the Blues". Nevertheless, Hume noted that the LP stood as the artist's first album on which the lyrics are easily understandable. Writing for The New York Times, Robert Palmer wrote that Costello's singing "exposes his own technical limitations", a comment supported by Robert Hilburn in the Los Angeles Times, who wrote that Costello's voice is ideal for "expressing ironies and nuances" in his own songs, but "lacks the purity and range" to effectively compete with the original versions of the tracks. Cash Box, on the other hand, proclaimed that the singer's "distinctive vocals fit perfectly into the country framework" and the songs are "rendered with conviction and emotion".

On the album as a whole, American critics were also mixed on Almost Blue. Carrie B. Cooper found in Boston Rock that Costello was "settling for love rather than passion". Meanwhile, Billboard magazine announced that the album "does for country what the band's Get Happy!! did for R&B—respect the music's form and essence, yet link both to Costello's own writing". Conversely, Hilburn deemed it a "major disappointment" that would serve as an intriguing piece for hardcore fans, but provide little enjoyment to everyone else. Finding that Almost Blue exhibited "little of Costello's usual vision", Hilburn contended that the LP would have improved if the artist had placed one of his own originals on it. Ultimately, Hilburn asserted that although Almost Blue is not a bad country album, it "simply lacks the power and originality we have come to expect from this invaluable figure". In Trouser Press, Jon Young felt that the artist would be a worthy participant in country as a whole once he presented more of himself into the genre. Young and Ira Robbins later labelled the album "surprisingly clumsy" and "a dud".

Additionally, several noted the continued absence of Costello's angry persona that had featured in his earlier works, while some also gave positive reactions to the performances of the Attractions. Writing for The Village Voice, critic Robert Christgau positively compared Almost Blue to other covers albums such as David Bowie's Pin Ups (1973) and John Lennon's Rock 'n' Roll (1975), records that "also seemed 'important' when they appeared".

Aftermath and legacy

After recording Imperial Bedroom in November 1981, Costello and the Attractions underwent the Almost Blue Tour from December to January 1982, playing major cities in the US and the UK. The setlist was composed of country songs from Almost Blue, as well as older and newer originals. On 7 January, Costello played to a sold out show at the Royal Albert Hall, fronting the 92-member Royal Philharmonic Orchestra. The show received praise from Allan Jones, who hailed that "Costello's voice raided every emotional avenue on its way to the heart." A live version of Parsons' "I'm Your Toy" from the show was released as a single in April, backed by renditions of Cash's "Cry! Cry! Cry!" and Joe Werner's "Wondering". Costello and the Attractions continued touring throughout the spring and summer of 1982, before Imperial Bedroom was released in July.

Although Costello had planted seeds of shifting musical styles with Get Happy!!, Almost Blue stood as the first true departure for the artist, predicting a career of ever-changing songwriting approaches, musical styles and experimentation. In 2016, Hodge commented that since Almost Blue, Costello has released several "unconventional and unexpected" albums amidst his "normal" albums, from the orchestral instrumental of G.B.H. (1991), the jazz ballads of North (2003), a ballet score (Il Sogno, 2004) and a collection of classical string quartet pieces with The Juliet Letters (1993), and further acknowledging the artist's collaborative records with the Roots (Wise Up Ghost, 2013), Burt Bacharach (Painted from Memory, 1998) and Allen Toussaint (The River in Reverse, 2006). Costello even made a return to country music in the late-2000s with the back-to-back releases of Secret, Profane & Sugarcane (2009) and National Ransom (2010). Hodge summarises:

Retrospective appraisal

Retrospectively, Almost Blue has received mixed-to-positive reviews from critics. In 1991, Armond White of Entertainment Weekly referred to the album as "Down-home homework by a brilliant student." Three years later, Q magazine's David Cavanagh acknowledged that "its exact point eluded most of us, although it arguably turned many others on to the genre from which it drew", further remarking that its first expanded reissue presented it as "a little too good to class as a career blip". Senior AllMusic editor Stephen Thomas Erlewine agreed, arguing that Almost Blue stands as "one of the most entertaining cover records in rock & roll" due to the enthusiasm behind the project. Reporting on the 2004 reissue, Uncut magazine's Chris Roberts argued that the album has aged rather well despite its reception being divisive on its initial release, highlighting "Sweet Dreams", "Good Year for the Roses" and "I'm Your Toy" as tracks that sound "as warm and nasty as ever". The online music service Rhapsody called it one of their favourite covers albums in 2010. In 2022, Chris Ingalls of PopMatters named Almost Blue one of Costello's ten most under-appreciated albums, finding the artist's embracement of the genre and the Attractions' fine performances make for a "worthwhile listen" and a "charming change of pace".

Costello's biographers have also shown appreciation for Almost Blue. In his book Elvis Costello: God's Comic, David Gouldstone describes the album as "a brave experiment, and a successful one". Clayton-Lea deems it "one of rock's finest and enriching sidesteps" while also summarising it as "another collection of good, even great songs". St. Michael commends the performances and overall good execution, further stating that Costello had already displayed "his command of the country lyric idiom" on tracks such as "Stranger in the House" and "Different Finger". Author James E. Perone calls the record uneven but finds it "presents Elvis Costello as a successful country balladeer who could effectively sing American country ballads and not simply try to capture the style." Graeme Thomson, on the other hand, describes Almost Blue as "a difficult record to love". He opines that despite its brevity—at a little over 30 minutes in length—it drags and "merely sound[s] funereal and oppressive", with the more up-tempo tracks "lumbering rather than fleet of foot".

Nevertheless, in lists ranking Costello's albums from worst to best, Almost Blue has consistently ranked in the lower tier. In 2021, writers for Stereogum placed it at number 18 (out of 27), deeming the material "serviceable" with "surprisingly perfunctory" results. They highlighted the album as a showcase for Costello's growth as a singer, particularly on "Good Year for the Roses", ultimately dubbing Almost Blue "a tentative dry run" for the artist's reach into more experimental territories. A year later, writing for Spin magazine, Al Shipley placed it at number 17 (out of 31), calling it "a fascinating early fusion of Costello's personal vision and his aspirations to master a wide variety of genres." Conversely, Michael Gallucci placed it at number 27 (out of 29) in Ultimate Classic Rock the same year – only above Costello's second all-covers album Kojak Variety (1995) and Goodbye Cruel World (1984) – deeming it the first misstep of the artist's career, failed by Costello's handling of the material.

Reissues
Almost Blue was first released on CD through Columbia and Demon Records in January 1986. Its first extended reissue through Demon in the UK and Rykodisc in the US on CD came in May 1994, which came with a slew of bonus tracks, including outtakes and live recordings. Hinton finds this reissue "more satisfying" than the original album, particularly highlighting the live performances in Aberdeen as "possessing a snap and crackle" lacking on the studio recordings. He also lists the Royal Albert Hall performance of "I'm Your Toy" as "pull[ing] dimensions out of Costello's voice barely hinted at in the studio version: urgency, passion and danger." Almost Blue was again reissued by Rhino Records on 3August 2004 as a two-disc set with additional bonus tracks. The album was later remastered and reissued by UMe on 6November 2015.

Track listing

Side one

 "Why Don't You Love Me (Like You Used to Do)?" (Hank Williams) – 1:40
 "Sweet Dreams" (Don Gibson) – 3:00
 "Success" (Johnny Mullins) – 2:41
 "I'm Your Toy" (Gram Parsons, Chris Ethridge) – 3:23
 "Tonight the Bottle Let Me Down" (Merle Haggard) – 2:09
 "Brown to Blue" (George Jones, Virginia Franks, "Country" Johnny Mathis) – 2:40

Side two

 "Good Year for the Roses" (Jerry Chesnut) – 3:10
 "Sittin' and Thinkin" (Charlie Rich) – 3:02
 "Color of the Blues" (Lawton Williams, George Jones) – 2:21
 "Too Far Gone" (Billy Sherrill) – 3:28
 "Honey Hush" (Lou Willie Turner) – 2:15
 "How Much I've Lied" (Parsons, Pam Rifkin) — 2:55

Note: "I'm Your Toy" was originally recorded by the Flying Burrito Brothers as "Hot Burrito No. 1" (on their 1969 album The Gilded Palace of Sin).

Personnel
According to the LP liner notes:

Elvis Costello – vocals, guitar
Steve Nieve – piano, organ
Bruce Thomas – bass
Pete Thomas – drums

Additional personnel
John McFee – lead guitar, pedal steel guitar
Tommy Millar – violin
Nashville Edition – backing vocals

Technical
Billy Sherrill – producer
Ron "Snake" Reynolds – engineer
"Fast" Eddie Hudson – assistant engineer

Keith Morris – photography

Charts

Weekly charts

Certifications

Notes

References

Sources

External links
 

1981 albums
Albums produced by Billy Sherrill
Columbia Records albums
Elvis Costello albums
F-Beat Records albums
Hip-O Records albums
Rhino Records albums
Rykodisc albums
Covers albums
Universal Music Enterprises albums